Il criminale, internationally known as Night Train to Milan, is a 1962 Italian thriller film directed by Marcello Baldi.

A gritty little intrigue thriller with Palance as an ex-nazi doctor in hiding. While riding on a train, he is recognized by passengers who remember him from their prisoner of war camp days. One thing leads to another and when Palance is cornered, he commits murder! He then takes a girl hostage.

Cast 
Jack Palance as Herr Bauer / Schneider 
Yvonne Furneaux as Angela 
Andrea Checchi as De Simone 
Tina Di Carlo as Bauer's mother
Fanfulla as the host 
Salvo Randone as Capotreno 
Franco Fabrizi as l'uomo snob 
Alfredo Rizzo as Signore pignolo 
Renato Terra as Sottufficiale di polizia 
Enzo Petito as barbone

References

External links

1962 films
Italian thriller films
1960s thriller films
Films directed by Marcello Baldi
Films scored by Carlo Rustichelli
Films set on trains
1960s Italian films